Jo Deseure is a Belgian stage and film actress. 

After developing an interest in acting, Deseure enrolled at the Institut Supérieur des Arts in Brussels and graduated from there in 1984. She later began working in theatre and became a regular performer at the Compagnie des Bosons in Ixelles.

She made her film debut in Toto the Hero (1991), a drama film directed by Jaco Van Dormael. Since then, Deseure has appeared in My Angel (2004), Sister Smile (2009), Sans laisser de traces (2010), and Madly in Life (2020). The latter film earned her a Magritte Award for Best Actress.

Selected filmography

References

External links

Living people
Belgian film actresses
Belgian stage actresses
Actresses from Brussels
20th-century Belgian actresses
21st-century Belgian actresses
Magritte Award winners
Year of birth missing (living people)